is a Japanese fashion designer known for mathematically inspired designs.

Information
Eri Matsui's 2000 collection featured many designs created using the Mathematica software program.  In the spring of 2006 she made news by designing a wedding dress intended to look good in zero-g and sponsored a design competition for clothing to be worn under such conditions, the Hyper Space Couture Design Contest.

History
Eri Matsui was born in 1952 in Aichi Prefecture. When she was in high school, she studied fine arts and design. When she was in high school, she continued those studied and also took part in graphic design. Matsui began designing her clothing in Chicago once her husband was transferred there.  She attended William Rainey Harper College and this is where she found her interest in Fashion Design. Then she spent six years in Chicago working and designing. After spending six years in Chicago, she returned to Japan where she started her company. Matsui had studios in Japan, Tokyo, and Paris. Her designs and clothing started to show up in Tokyo Collection in the mid-1990s and has remained constant there.

References

Sources
Design for the First Astrobride  The Guardian, May 3, 2006.
On the Runway: Spacewear Meant to Dazzle, Even in Zero Gravity by Dennis Overbye.  The New York Times May 16, 2006.

External links
Eri Matsui official website
Mathematica in High Fashion
artfuture, Eri Matsui

Japanese fashion designers
Japanese women fashion designers
1952 births
Living people
People from Aichi Prefecture